Panther Creek Falls is a  waterfall on Panther Creek in the Wind River Valley in Skamania County, Washington. The waterfall is perennial.

Trail
The waterfall and the creek which leads up to it are accessible by a trail maintained by the Forest Service. In addition to the maintained trail, a viewing deck was constructed to the right at a Y in the trail where you can see the main, horsetail portion of the waterfall. The trail continues down to the left at the Y for those who wish to see the final  drop.

Structure
The waterfall is produced by Panther Creek approaching a cliff and then sharply making a turn. Some of the water rushes too quickly and falls over the side prematurely at the bend, but the majority of the water follows the creek until it reaches a natural trough which then drops off. At the dropoff, the horsetail begins the first tier of the waterfall, which drops . After this, a  drop concludes the waterfall and the creek continues.

References

Landforms of Skamania County, Washington
Waterfalls of Washington (state)
Tourist attractions in Skamania County, Washington
Columbia River Gorge
Gifford Pinchot National Forest
Waterfalls of Skamania County, Washington